John G. Benson House is located in Englewood, Bergen County, New Jersey, United States. The house was added to the National Register of Historic Places on January 9, 1983. Its historical significance comes from being an example of post-Revolutionary War Dutch Colonial architecture.

History
The John G. Benson House was built c. 1800 by farmer and former militia caption John G. Benson.

See also
National Register of Historic Places listings in Bergen County, New Jersey

References

Englewood, New Jersey
Houses on the National Register of Historic Places in New Jersey
Houses in Bergen County, New Jersey
National Register of Historic Places in Bergen County, New Jersey
New Jersey Register of Historic Places